Zarechny (masculine), Zarechnaya (feminine), or Zarechnoye (neuter) is the name of several inhabited localities in Russia.

Modern inhabited localities

Altai Krai
As of 2010, four rural localities in Altai Krai bear this name:
Zarechny, Pankrushikhinsky District, Altai Krai, a settlement in Pankrushikhinsky Selsoviet of Pankrushikhinsky District
Zarechny, Smolensky District, Altai Krai, a settlement in Linevsky Selsoviet of Smolensky District
Zarechny, Sovetsky District, Altai Krai, a settlement in Shulginsky Selsoviet of Sovetsky District
Zarechnoye, Altai Krai, a selo in Tyagunsky Selsoviet of Kytmanovsky District

Amur Oblast
As of 2010, four rural localities in Amur Oblast bear this name:
Zarechny, Amur Oblast, a settlement in Grodekovsky Rural Settlement of Blagoveshchensky District
Zarechnoye, Arkharinsky District, Amur Oblast, a selo in Otvazhnensky Rural Settlement of Arkharinsky District
Zarechnoye, Belogorsky District, Amur Oblast, a selo in Ozeryansky Rural Settlement of Belogorsky District
Zarechnoye, Zeysky District, Amur Oblast, a selo in Amuro-Baltiysky Rural Settlement of Zeysky District

Astrakhan Oblast
As of 2010, one rural locality in Astrakhan Oblast bears this name:
Zarechnoye, Astrakhan Oblast, a selo in Novogeorgiyevsky Selsoviet of Limansky District

Republic of Bashkortostan
As of 2010, two rural localities in the Republic of Bashkortostan bear this name:
Zarechny, Blagovarsky District, Republic of Bashkortostan, a village in Yazykovsky Selsoviet of Blagovarsky District
Zarechny, Gafuriysky District, Republic of Bashkortostan, a village in Krasnousolsky Selsoviet of Gafuriysky District

Belgorod Oblast
As of 2010, two rural localities in Belgorod Oblast bear this name:
Zarechnoye, Borisovsky District, Belgorod Oblast, a selo in Strigunovsky Rural Okrug of Borisovsky District
Zarechnoye, Chernyansky District, Belgorod Oblast, a khutor in Chernyansky District

Bryansk Oblast
As of 2010, four rural localities in Bryansk Oblast bear this name:
Zarechny, Bryansk Oblast, a settlement in Knyagininsky Selsoviet of Sevsky District
Zarechnoye, Bryansk Oblast, a selo in Yudinovsky Selsoviet of Pogarsky District
Zarechnaya, Komarichsky District, Bryansk Oblast, a village in Bykhovsky Selsoviet of Komarichsky District
Zarechnaya, Zhiryatinsky District, Bryansk Oblast, a village in Strashevichsky Selsoviet of Zhiryatinsky District

Republic of Buryatia
As of 2010, one urban locality in the Republic of Buryatia bears this name:
Zarechny, Republic of Buryatia, an urban-type settlement under the administrative jurisdiction of Sovetsky City District of the City of Republic Significance of Ulan-Ude

Chelyabinsk Oblast
As of 2010, two rural localities in Chelyabinsk Oblast bear this name:
Zarechny, Agapovsky District, Chelyabinsk Oblast, a settlement in Buranny Selsoviet of Agapovsky District
Zarechny, Nagaybaksky District, Chelyabinsk Oblast, a settlement in Balkansky Selsoviet of Nagaybaksky District

Chuvash Republic
As of 2010, one rural locality in the Chuvash Republic bears this name:
Zarechny, Chuvash Republic, a settlement in Nikulinskoye Rural Settlement of Poretsky District

Republic of Dagestan
As of 2010, one rural locality in the Republic of Dagestan bears this name:
Zarechnoye, Republic of Dagestan, a selo in Krasnoarmeysky Selsoviet of Kizlyarsky District

Irkutsk Oblast
As of 2014, four rural localities in Irkutsk Oblast bear this name:
Zarechny, Irkutsk Oblast, a settlement in Nukutsky District of Ust-Orda Buryat Okrug
Zarechnoye, Kachugsky District, Irkutsk Oblast, a selo in Kachugsky District
Zarechnoye, Tayshetsky District, Irkutsk Oblast, a selo in Tayshetsky District
Zarechnoye, Alarsky District, Irkutsk Oblast, a village in Alarsky District of Ust-Orda Buryat Okrug

Ivanovo Oblast
As of 2010, one rural locality in Ivanovo Oblast bears this name:
Zarechny, Ivanovo Oblast, a selo in Zavolzhsky District

Jewish Autonomous Oblast
As of 2010, one rural locality in the Jewish Autonomous Oblast bears this name:
Zarechnoye, Jewish Autonomous Oblast, a selo in Obluchensky District

Kabardino-Balkar Republic
As of 2010, one rural locality in the Kabardino-Balkar Republic bears this name:
Zarechnoye, Kabardino-Balkar Republic, a selo in Prokhladnensky District

Kaliningrad Oblast
As of 2010, two rural localities in Kaliningrad Oblast bear this name:
Zarechnoye, Bagrationovsky District, Kaliningrad Oblast, a settlement in Nivensky Rural Okrug of Bagrationovsky District
Zarechnoye, Krasnoznamensky District, Kaliningrad Oblast, a settlement in Alekseyevsky Rural Okrug of Krasnoznamensky District

Kaluga Oblast
As of 2010, two rural localities in Kaluga Oblast bear this name:
Zarechny, Kaluga Oblast, a selo in Lyudinovsky District
Zarechnaya, Kaluga Oblast, a village in Medynsky District

Karachay-Cherkess Republic
As of 2010, one rural locality in the Karachay-Cherkess Republic bears this name:
Zarechny, Karachay-Cherkess Republic, a settlement in Prikubansky District

Republic of Karelia
As of 2010, one rural locality in the Republic of Karelia bears this name:
Zarechny, Republic of Karelia, a settlement under the administrative jurisdiction of the city of republic significance of Kostomuksha

Kemerovo Oblast
As of 2010, four rural localities in Kemerovo Oblast bear this name:
Zarechny, Guryevsky District, Kemerovo Oblast, a settlement in Sosnovskaya Rural Territory of Guryevsky District
Zarechny, Mariinsky District, Kemerovo Oblast, a settlement in Bolsheantibesskaya Rural Territory of Mariinsky District
Zarechny, Mezhdurechensky District, Kemerovo Oblast, a settlement in Kurtukovskaya Rural Territory of Mezhdurechensky District
Zarechnoye, Kemerovo Oblast, a selo under the administrative jurisdiction of the town of oblast significance of Belovo

Republic of Khakassia
As of 2010, one rural locality in the Republic of Khakassia bears this name:
Zarechnaya, Republic of Khakassia, a village in Pervomaysky Selsoviet of Bogradsky District

Khanty–Mansi Autonomous Okrug
As of 2010, one rural locality in Khanty–Mansi Autonomous Okrug bears this name:
Zarechny, Khanty–Mansi Autonomous Okrug, a settlement in Oktyabrsky District

Kirov Oblast
As of 2010, three rural localities in Kirov Oblast bear this name:
Zarechny, Kotelnichsky District, Kirov Oblast, a settlement in Makaryevsky Rural Okrug of Kotelnichsky District
Zarechny, Urzhumsky District, Kirov Oblast, a settlement in Tsepochkinsky Rural Okrug of Urzhumsky District
Zarechny, Verkhnekamsky District, Kirov Oblast, a settlement under the administrative jurisdiction of  the urban-type settlement of  Lesnoy, Verkhnekamsky District

Komi Republic
As of 2010, one rural locality in the Komi Republic bears this name:
Zarechnoye, Komi Republic, a village in Kuratovo selo Administrative Territory of Sysolsky District

Krasnoyarsk Krai
As of 2010, two rural localities in Krasnoyarsk Krai bear this name:
Zarechny, Kozulsky District, Krasnoyarsk Krai, a settlement in Zhukovsky Selsoviet of Kozulsky District
Zarechny, Kuraginsky District, Krasnoyarsk Krai, a settlement in Detlovsky Selsoviet of Kuraginsky District

Kurgan Oblast
As of 2010, one rural locality in Kurgan Oblast bears this name:
Zarechnaya, Kurgan Oblast, a village in Pervomaysky Selsoviet of Mishkinsky District

Lipetsk Oblast
As of 2010, three rural localities in Lipetsk Oblast bear this name:
Zarechnoye, Lipetsk Oblast, a selo in Zarechensky Selsoviet of Terbunsky District
Zarechnaya, Chaplyginsky District, Lipetsk Oblast, a village in Istobensky Selsoviet of Chaplyginsky District
Zarechnaya, Dolgorukovsky District, Lipetsk Oblast, a village in Veselovsky Selsoviet of Dolgorukovsky District

Republic of Mordovia
As of 2010, three rural localities in the Republic of Mordovia bear this name:
Zarechny, Kochkurovsky District, Republic of Mordovia, a settlement in Bulgakovsky Selsoviet of Kochkurovsky District
Zarechny, Romodanovsky District, Republic of Mordovia, a settlement in Pushkinsky Selsoviet of Romodanovsky District
Zarechnoye, Republic of Mordovia, a selo in Starozubarevsky Selsoviet of Krasnoslobodsky District

Moscow Oblast
As of 2010, two rural localities in Moscow Oblast bear this name:
Zarechny, Kolomensky District, Moscow Oblast, a settlement in Biorkovskoye Rural Settlement of Kolomensky District
Zarechny, Sergiyevo-Posadsky District, Moscow Oblast, a settlement in Lozovskoye Rural Settlement of Sergiyevo-Posadsky District

Nizhny Novgorod Oblast
As of 2010, six rural localities in Nizhny Novgorod Oblast bear this name:
Zarechny, Bor, Nizhny Novgorod Oblast, a settlement in Lindovsky Selsoviet of the city of oblast significance of Bor
Zarechny, Koverninsky District, Nizhny Novgorod Oblast, a settlement in Gorevsky Selsoviet of Koverninsky District
Zarechny, Sharangsky District, Nizhny Novgorod Oblast, a settlement in Bolsheustinsky Selsoviet of Sharangsky District
Zarechny, Varnavinsky District, Nizhny Novgorod Oblast, a settlement in Severny Selsoviet of Varnavinsky District
Zarechnoye, Ardatovsky District, Nizhny Novgorod Oblast, a selo in Steksovsky Selsoviet of Ardatovsky District
Zarechnoye, Arzamassky District, Nizhny Novgorod Oblast, a selo in Berezovsky Selsoviet of Arzamassky District

Novgorod Oblast
As of 2010, three rural localities in Novgorod Oblast bear this name:
Zarechnaya, Batetsky District, Novgorod Oblast, a village in Peredolskoye Settlement of Batetsky District
Zarechnaya, Borovichsky District, Novgorod Oblast, a village in Sushanskoye Settlement of Borovichsky District
Zarechnaya, Okulovsky District, Novgorod Oblast, a village in Borovenkovskoye Settlement of Okulovsky District

Novosibirsk Oblast
As of 2010, two rural localities in Novosibirsk Oblast bear this name:
Zarechny, Novosibirsk Oblast, a settlement in Kuybyshevsky District
Zarechnoye, Novosibirsk Oblast, a selo in Toguchinsky District

Omsk Oblast
As of 2010, one rural locality in Omsk Oblast bears this name:
Zarechnoye, Omsk Oblast, a selo in Zarechensky Rural Okrug of Novovarshavsky District

Orenburg Oblast
As of 2010, one rural locality in Orenburg Oblast bears this name:
Zarechnoye, Orenburg Oblast, a selo in Zarechny Selsoviet of Tashlinsky District

Oryol Oblast
As of 2010, three rural localities in Oryol Oblast bear this name:
Zarechny, Kolpnyansky District, Oryol Oblast, a settlement in Ushakovsky Selsoviet of Kolpnyansky District
Zarechny, Uritsky District, Oryol Oblast, a settlement in Kotovsky Selsoviet of Uritsky District
Zarechnaya, Oryol Oblast, a village in Stanovskoy Selsoviet of Orlovsky District

Penza Oblast
As of 2010, five inhabited localities in Penza Oblast bear this name:
Zarechny, Penza Oblast, a town of oblast significance
Zarechny, Mokshansky District, Penza Oblast, a rural locality (a settlement) in Uspensky Selsoviet of Mokshansky District
Zarechny, Nikolsky District, Penza Oblast, a rural locality (a settlement) in Nochkinsky Selsoviet of Nikolsky District
Zarechny, Nizhnelomovsky District, Penza Oblast, a rural locality (a settlement) in Verkhnelomovsky Selsoviet of Nizhnelomovsky District
Zarechnaya, Penza Oblast, a rural locality (a village) in Yurovsky Selsoviet of Mokshansky District

Perm Krai
As of 2010, three rural localities in Perm Krai bear this name:
Zarechnaya, Krasnokamsk, Perm Krai, a village under the administrative jurisdiction of the city of krai significance of Krasnokamsk
Zarechnaya (Gamovskoye Rural Settlement), Permsky District, Perm Krai, a village in Permsky District; municipally, a part of Gamovskoye Rural Settlement of that district
Zarechnaya (Yugo-Kamskoye Rural Settlement), Permsky District, Perm Krai, a village in Permsky District; municipally, a part of Yugo-Kamskoye Rural Settlement of that district

Primorsky Krai
As of 2010, two rural localities in Primorsky Krai bear this name:
Zarechnoye, Ussuriysk, Primorsky Krai, a selo under the administrative jurisdiction of the Ussuriysk City Under Krai Jurisdiction
Zarechnoye, Oktyabrsky District, Primorsky Krai, a selo in Oktyabrsky District

Rostov Oblast
As of 2010, four rural localities in Rostov Oblast bear this name:
Zarechny, Kuybyshevsky District, Rostov Oblast, a khutor in Kuybyshevskoye Rural Settlement of Kuybyshevsky District
Zarechny (khutor), Kommunarskoye Rural Settlement, Oktyabrsky District, Rostov Oblast, a khutor in Kommunarskoye Rural Settlement of Oktyabrsky District
Zarechny (settlement), Kommunarskoye Rural Settlement, Oktyabrsky District, Rostov Oblast, a settlement in Kommunarskoye Rural Settlement of Oktyabrsky District
Zarechny, Zernogradsky District, Rostov Oblast, a khutor in Gulyay-Borisovskoye Rural Settlement of Zernogradsky District

Sakha Republic
As of 2010, one rural locality in the Sakha Republic bears this name:
Zarechny, Sakha Republic, a selo in Olyokminsky District

Sakhalin Oblast
As of 2010, one rural locality in Sakhalin Oblast bears this name:
Zarechnoye, Sakhalin Oblast, a selo in Tomarinsky District

Saratov Oblast
As of 2010, four rural localities in Saratov Oblast bear this name:
Zarechny, Dergachyovsky District, Saratov Oblast, a settlement in Dergachyovsky District
Zarechny, Novouzensky District, Saratov Oblast, a khutor in Novouzensky District
Zarechny, Pugachyovsky District, Saratov Oblast, a settlement in Pugachyovsky District
Zarechnoye, Saratov Oblast, a selo in Balashovsky District

Stavropol Krai
As of 2010, one rural locality in Stavropol Krai bears this name:
Zarechny, Stavropol Krai, a settlement in Gorkovsky Selsoviet of Novoalexandrovsky District

Sverdlovsk Oblast
Zarechny, Sverdlovsk Oblast, a town of oblast significance

Tambov Oblast
As of 2010, three rural localities in Tambov Oblast bear this name:
Zarechny, Kirsanovsky District, Tambov Oblast, a settlement in Kalaissky Selsoviet of Kirsanovsky District
Zarechny, Morshansky District, Tambov Oblast, a settlement in Alkuzhborkovsky Selsoviet of Morshansky District
Zarechnaya, Tambov Oblast, a village in Nikitinsky Selsoviet of Inzhavinsky District

Republic of Tatarstan
As of 2010, one rural locality in the Republic of Tatarstan bears this name:
Zarechny, Republic of Tatarstan, a settlement in Nurlatsky District

Tomsk Oblast
As of 2010, three rural localities in Tomsk Oblast bear this name:
Zarechny, Pervomaysky District, Tomsk Oblast, a settlement in Pervomaysky District
Zarechny (Mezheninovskoye Rural Settlement), Tomsky District, Tomsk Oblast, a settlement in Tomsky District; municipally, a part of Mezheninovskoye Rural Settlement of that district
Zarechny (Malinovskoye Rural Settlement), Tomsky District, Tomsk Oblast, a settlement in Tomsky District; municipally, a part of Malinovskoye Rural Settlement of that district

Tver Oblast
As of 2010, two rural localities in Tver Oblast bear this name:
Zarechnaya, Firovsky District, Tver Oblast, a village in Firovsky District
Zarechnaya, Rzhevsky District, Tver Oblast, a village in Rzhevsky District

Tyumen Oblast
As of 2010, two rural localities in Tyumen Oblast bear this name:
Zarechny, Vagaysky District, Tyumen Oblast, a settlement in Zarechensky Rural Okrug of Vagaysky District
Zarechny, Yarkovsky District, Tyumen Oblast, a settlement in Shchetkovsky Rural Okrug of Yarkovsky District

Udmurt Republic
As of 2010, two rural localities in the Udmurt Republic bear this name:
Zarechny, Balezinsky District, Udmurt Republic, a selo in Voyegurtsky Selsoviet of Balezinsky District
Zarechny, Grakhovsky District, Udmurt Republic, a selo in Porymozarechny Selsoviet of Grakhovsky District

Ulyanovsk Oblast
As of 2010, one rural locality in Ulyanovsk Oblast bears this name:
Zarechnoye, Ulyanovsk Oblast, a selo under the administrative jurisdiction of  Starotimoshkinsky Settlement Okrug of Baryshsky District

Vladimir Oblast
As of 2010, two rural localities in Vladimir Oblast bear this name:
Zarechny, Vladimir Oblast, a settlement in Vyaznikovsky District
Zarechnoye, Vladimir Oblast, a selo in Sobinsky District

Volgograd Oblast
As of 2010, one rural locality in Volgograd Oblast bears this name:
Zarechny, Volgograd Oblast, a settlement in Gornopolyansky Selsoviet of Volgograd

Vologda Oblast
As of 2010, six rural localities in Vologda Oblast bear this name:
Zarechny, Vologda Oblast, a settlement in Lipino-Borsky Selsoviet of Vashkinsky District
Zarechnoye, Vologda Oblast, a village in Domshinsky Selsoviet of Sheksninsky District
Zarechnaya, Shapshinsky Selsoviet, Kharovsky District, Vologda Oblast, a village in Shapshinsky Selsoviet of Kharovsky District
Zarechnaya, Shevnitsky Selsoviet, Kharovsky District, Vologda Oblast, a village in Shevnitsky Selsoviet of Kharovsky District
Zarechnaya, Vologodsky District, Vologda Oblast, a village in Oktyabrsky Selsoviet of Vologodsky District
Zarechnaya, Vozhegodsky District, Vologda Oblast, a village in Nizhneslobodsky Selsoviet of Vozhegodsky District

Voronezh Oblast
As of 2010, one rural locality in Voronezh Oblast bears this name:
Zarechny, Voronezh Oblast, a settlement in Verkhneikoretskoye Rural Settlement of Bobrovsky District

Yaroslavl Oblast
As of 2010, two rural localities in Yaroslavl Oblast bear this name:
Zarechny, Yaroslavl Oblast, a settlement in Lyubilkovsky Rural Okrug of Rostovsky District
Zarechnoye, Yaroslavl Oblast, a village in Uritsky Rural Okrug of Pervomaysky District

Zabaykalsky Krai
As of 2010, two rural localities in Zabaykalsky Krai bear this name:
Zarechny, Zabaykalsky Krai, a settlement in Nerchinsky District
Zarechnoye, Zabaykalsky Krai, a selo in Tungiro-Olyokminsky District

Abolished inhabited localities
Zarechny, Ryazan Oblast, a former urban-type settlement in Ryazan Oblast; since 2004—a part of the town of Skopin

References